Deh-e Mirzai (also Romanized as Deh-e Mīrzā’ī and Deh Mīrzā’ī) is a village in Kiskan Rural District, in the Central District of Baft County, Kerman Province, Iran. At the 2006 census, its population was 36, in 12 families.

References 

Populated places in Baft County